Thomas Moore Sturgess (24 September 1898 – 2 February 1974) was an Indian cricketer. A wicket-keeper, he played first-class cricket in India in the 1940s, having previously represented the Egypt national cricket team.

Biography

Born in Assam in 1898, Thomas Sturgess made his debut for Egypt against HM Martineau's XI in 1929. He played twice more for Egypt against the same opposition in 1931 and 1932, also playing against them for Alexandria Cricket Club in those years.

His first-class career didn't begin until December 1940 when he played in the Bombay Pentangular Tournament for the Europeans at the age of 42. He played in the tournament again three years later. He died in Cape Town in 1974.

References

1898 births
1974 deaths
Cricketers from Assam
Egyptian cricketers
Indian cricketers
Europeans cricketers